The Littlefield-Roberts House is a historic house located in Cambridge, Massachusetts.

Description and history 
The -story wood-frame house was built in 1873 by Joseph Littlefield, and is one of the finest late Second Empire houses in the city. The main facade has a heavily ornamented entry on the left, and a full-height projecting bay on the right that is capped by a polygonal roof. The roof is pierced by hip-roofed dormers whose windows have decorated surrounds.

The house was listed on the National Register of Historic Places on September 12, 1986.

See also
National Register of Historic Places listings in Cambridge, Massachusetts

References

Houses completed in 1873
Houses on the National Register of Historic Places in Cambridge, Massachusetts
Second Empire architecture in Massachusetts